The Asociación de Guías Scouts Dominicanas (AGSD; Dominican Girl Guide Association) is the national Guiding organization of the Dominican Republic. It serves 588 members (as of 2003). Founded in 1961, the girls-only organization became a full member of the World Association of Girl Guides and Girl Scouts in 1969.  The Dominican Republic Girl scout uniforms are the same as the United States uniforms.

The Guide Motto is Siempre lista, Be prepared.

See also
 Asociación de Scouts Dominicanos

References

World Association of Girl Guides and Girl Scouts member organizations
Scouting and Guiding in the Dominican Republic
Youth organizations established in 1961